This is a list of fortifications in Afghanistan, including fortresses and castles, arranged alphabetically.

List

References

Forts in Afghanistan
Palaces in Afghanistan
Afghanistan
Castles
Castles
Afghanistan